Rhinella xerophylla is an extinct species of toad in the genus Rhinella found in Argentina. It lived in the Pliocene period and inhabited tropical rainforests of South America.

References

Cenozoic amphibians of South America
Pliocene animals of South America
xerophylla